The 1946 Wyoming gubernatorial election took place on November 5, 1946. Incumbent Democratic Governor Lester C. Hunt ran for re-election to a second term. Former Republican Governor Nels H. Smith, whom Hunt defeated in 1942, announced that he would challenge Hunt for re-election, but he was defeated the Republican primary by State Treasurer Earl Wright. In the general election, even though the Republican Party had a strong performance nationwide, Wyoming Democrats did well; Hunt defeated Wright by a wider margin than his 1942 victory as Democratic U.S. Senator Joseph C. O'Mahoney similarly won another term.

Democratic primary

Candidates
 Lester C. Hunt, incumbent Governor

Results

Republican Primary

Candidates
 Earl Wright, Wyoming State Treasurer
 Nels H. Smith, former Governor of Wyoming

Results

Results

References

1946 Wyoming elections
1946
Wyoming
November 1946 events in the United States